Media archaeology or media archeology is a field that attempts to understand new and emerging media through close examination of the past, and especially through critical scrutiny of dominant progressivist narratives of popular commercial media such as film and television. Media archaeologists often evince strong interest in so-called dead media, noting that new media often revive and recirculate material and techniques of communication that had been lost, neglected, or obscured. Some media archaeologists are also concerned with the relationship between media fantasies and technological development, especially the ways in which ideas about imaginary or speculative media affect the media that actually emerge.

The theories and concepts of media archaeology have been primarily elaborated by the scholars and cultural critics Thomas Elsaesser, Erkki Huhtamo, Siegfried Zielinski, and Wolfgang Ernst, taking off from earlier work by Michel Foucault on the archaeology of knowledge, Walter Benjamin on the culture of mass media, and film scholars such as C.W. Ceram on the archaeology of cinema. Other writers who have contributed to the discipline's emergence include Eric Kluitenberg, Anne Friedberg, Friedrich Kittler, and Jonathan Crary. New media theorist Jussi Parikka defines media archaeology as follows:

Media archaeology exists somewhere between materialist media theories and the insistence on the value of the obsolete and forgotten through new cultural histories that have emerged since the 1980s. I see media archaeology as a theoretically refined analysis of the historical layers of media in their singularity—a conceptual and practical exercise in carving out the aesthetic, cultural, and political singularities of media. And it's much more than paying theoretical attention to the intensive relations between new and old media mediated through concrete and conceptual archives; increasingly, media archaeology is a method for doing media design and art.

Further reading
 Alloa, Emmanuel. Looking Through Images. A Phenomenology of Visual Media. Columbia University Press, 2021.
 Grau, Oliver. Into the Belly of the Image: Historical Aspects of Virtual Reality. In: Leonardo: Journal of the International Society for the Arts, Sciences and Technology. Vol. 32, Issue 5, 1999, S. 365–372. (English extract of Master Thesis: Die Sehnsucht im Bild zu sein, Hamburg 1994).
Huhtamo, Erkki and Jussi Parikka (Eds.). Media Archaeology: Approaches, Applications, and Implications. University of California Press, 2011.
Huhtamo, Erkki. "Time traveling in the gallery: an archeological approach in media art." In Immersed in technology, Mary Anne Moser and Douglas MacLeod (Eds.). MIT Press, Cambridge, MA, USA 233–268. 1996.
Kluitenberg, Eric. Book of Imaginary Media: Excavating the Dream of the Ultimate Communication Medium. Rotterdam NAI Publishers, 2006.
Parikka, Jussi. What Is Media Archaeology? Polity, 2012.
Zielinski, Siegfried. Deep Time of the Media: Toward an Archaeology of Hearing and Seeing by Technical Mean. MIT Press, 2008.

References

Archaeological sub-disciplines
Media studies
Cultural studies